Adam Anderson AM LLD  (27 June 1783 – 5 December 1846) was a Scottish physicist and encyclopedist. He was the rector of Perth Academy from 1811 to 1839, and Professor of Natural and Experimental Philosophy 1839 to 1846 at St Andrews University.

Anderson designed and supervised the construction of Perth Water Works, and supervised the construction of the royal burgh's gasworks.

He contributed original papers on the measurement of the heights of mountains by the barometer, the hygrometric state of the atmosphere, the dew point, and the illuminating power of coal gas, to Nicholson's Journal, vol. xxx. 1812, to Thomson's Annals of Philosophy, vol. ix. 1817, and to the Edinburgh Philosophical Journal, vols. ii, iv, xi, xii, xiii, &c. The Perth gasworks were originally constructed under his superintendence, and he introduced many improvements leading to the economical production of gas. He wrote the articles "Barometer", "Cold", "Dyeing", "Fermentation", "Evaporation", "Hygrometry", "Navigation", and "Physical Geography" in Brewster's Edinburgh Encyclopædia (completed 1830), and the article "Gaslight" in the Encyclopædia Britannica.

He died on 5 December 1846, aged 63, and is buried in the south-east section of Greyfriars Burial Ground in Perth.

References
Specific

General

Adam Anderson – Dictionary of Scottish Architects

Attribution

Scottish science writers
Scottish physicists
Scottish meteorologists
Scottish encyclopedists
1846 deaths
19th-century Scottish people
Academics of the University of St Andrews
1783 births
Scottish schoolteachers
Fellows of the Royal Society of Edinburgh
Alumni of the University of St Andrews
People from Perth, Scotland
19th-century British physicists
19th-century Scottish scientists
19th-century Scottish educators